Asbach may refer to:

Places in Germany
Asbach, Birkenfeld, in the Birkenfeld district, Rhineland-Palatinate
Asbach (Verbandsgemeinde), a collective municipality in the Neuwied district, Rhineland-Palatinate
Asbach (Westerwald), a local municipality
Asbach-Sickenberg, in the Eichsfeld district, Thuringia
Asbach-Bäumenheim, in the Donau-Ries district, Bavaria
Asbach (Laberweinting), a village in Laberweinting, Straubing-Bogen district, Bavaria
A locality in Schmalkalden district, Thuringia
Asbach, Hesse, a district of the municipality Modautal

Other uses
Asbach Uralt, a German brandy

See also
Aspach (disambiguation)